Nora Novotny (born 2 July 1939) is an Austrian former swimmer. She competed in the women's 100 metre freestyle at the 1960 Summer Olympics.

References

External links
 

1939 births
Living people
Olympic swimmers of Austria
Swimmers at the 1960 Summer Olympics
Swimmers from Vienna
Austrian female freestyle swimmers